Keith Pollard (born January 20, 1950) is an American comic book artist. Originally from the Detroit area, Pollard is best known for his simultaneous work on the Marvel Comics titles The Amazing Spider-Man, Fantastic Four, and Thor in the late 1970s–early 1980s.

Career
Keith Pollard made his professional comics debut in 1974 with stints on such titles as Master of Kung Fu, Deadly Hands of Kung Fu, Astonishing Tales, and Black Goliath. In the mid 1970s he also drew original covers for some of the weekly titles in the Marvel UK imprint. He was the regular penciller of The Amazing Spider-Man from issue #186 (Nov. 1978) through issue #205 (June 1980) and pencilled the backup feature in The Amazing Spider-Man Annual #15 (1981). With writer Marv Wolfman, Pollard introduced the Black Cat in The Amazing Spider-Man #194 (July 1979). Wolfman and Pollard were the creative team for both Fantastic Four #200 (Nov. 1978) and The Amazing Spider-Man #200 (Jan. 1980).

Pollard was also the regular penciler of Thor issues #286–320. In 1982, Pollard moved to DC Comics where he drew part of Wonder Woman #300 (Feb. 1983) and launched the Vigilante series with Marv Wolfman. He and Elliot S. Maggin co-created the Kristin Wells version of Superwoman in DC Comics Presents Annual #2 (1983).

In 1987, he returned to Marvel where he had a second run on Fantastic Four, with writer Steve Englehart, that lasted until 1989. Afterwards, he pencilled Nick Fury, Agent of S.H.I.E.L.D. #2–10.

Pollard and Stan Lee produced the Silver Surfer: The Enslavers graphic novel in 1990. In the early 1990s he drew all the character profiles for the Official Handbook of the Marvel Universe Master Edition.

Pollard left comics in 1996, though he occasionally makes appearances at comic book conventions. He returned to comics in 2019 with a story for DC Primal Age Giant, written by Marv Wolfman.

Bibliography

DC Comics

 DC Comics Presents Annual #2 (1983)
 DC Primal Age Giant #1 (2019) 
 Green Lantern #157–165 (1982–1983)
 Justice League of America #197 (1981)
 The New Teen Titans #35–36 (1983)
 Vigilante #1–3, 5 (1983–1984)
 Who's Who: The Definitive Directory of the DC Universe #18, 23 (1986–1987)
 Wonder Woman #300 (1983)
 World's Finest Comics #279 (1982)

Milestone Media
 Hardware #20, 40 (1994–1996)
 Heroes #6 (1996)
 Static #40 (1996)

Harvey Comics
 SeaQuest #1 (1994)

Illustrated Comics 

 Classic Jonny Quest (four promo minicomics) (1996)

Innovation Publishing
 Cobalt Blue #1–2 (1989)

Marvel Comics

 Alpha Flight #127 (1993)
 The Amazing Spider-Man #186–205, Annual #15 (1978–1981)
 Astonishing Tales #30–32, 36 (1975–1976)
 The Avengers #146, Annual #16 (1976, 1987)
 Black Goliath #5 (1976)
 Blackwulf #5 (1994)
 Blaze #9 (1995)
 Daredevil #143, 242, 341–342 (1977, 1987, 1995)
 Deadly Hands of Kung Fu #5 (1974)
 Eternals vol. 2 #10–11 (1986)
 Fantastic Four #193–201, 203–206, 310–312, 314–320, 322–324, 326–328, Annual #12 (1978–1979, 1987–1989)
 Fantastic Four Roast #1 (1982)
 Ghost Rider #22 (1977)
 Hulk #12 (1978)
 Inhumans #10–12 (1977)
 Iron Man #73–74, 107, 110–112 (1975–1978)
 Jungle Action #24 (1976)
 Lethal Foes of Spider-Man #3 (1993)
 Marvel Graphic Novel: Silver Surfer: The Enslavers HC (1990)
 Marvel Super-Heroes vol. 2 #1, 15 (1990–1993)
 Master of Kung Fu #26, 36–37, 52, Giant-Size #4, Annual #1 (1975–1977)
 Moon Knight #26 (1982)
 Ms. Marvel #9 (1977)
 New Mutants #39 (1986)
 Nick Fury, Agent of S.H.I.E.L.D. vol. 2 #2–10, 13–14 (1989–1990)
 The Official Handbook of the Marvel Universe #2, 4–6, 11–12 (1983)
 The Official Handbook of the Marvel Universe Deluxe Edition #6, 8, 13–20 (1986–1988)
 The Official Handbook of the Marvel Universe Master Edition #1–36 (1990–1993)
 The Official Handbook of the Marvel Universe Update '89 #7 (1989)
 Power Man #30 (1976)
Pro Action Magazine vol. 2 #3 (Spider-Man) (1994)
 The Rampaging Hulk #5–7 (1977–1978)
 Spider-Man 2099 #36 (1995)
 Thor #281–282, 286–289, 291–302, 304–308, 310–317, 319–320, 482 (1979–1982, 1995)
 Thunderstrike #7, 11 (1994)
 X-Factor #4 (1986)
 X-Men vs. the Avengers #4 (1987)

References

External links

 
 Keith Pollard at Mike's Amazing World of Comics
 Keith Pollard at the Unofficial Handbook of Marvel Comics Creators
 Comicbook-Art.com Official Representative for commissions

1950 births
20th-century American artists
21st-century American artists
African-American comics creators
American comics artists
American comics creators
Artists from Detroit
DC Comics people
Inkpot Award winners
Living people
Marvel Comics people
Place of birth missing (living people)